Leaving Songs may refer to:

 Leaving Songs (Kristofer Åström album), a 2001 album
Leaving Songs (Stuart A. Staples album), a 2006 album